The National Hot Dog and Sausage Council (NHDSC) is an American trade association that promotes the hot dog and sausage industry.

It was founded in 1994 by the American Meat Institute.  It is headquartered in Washington, D.C. Eric Mittenthal is the current President.

The council promotes July as National Hot Dog Month, and  National Hot Dog Day which falls on the third Wednesday in July. The 2022 National Hot Dog Day is Wednesday, July 20. Similarly, it promotes October as National Sausage Month.

In November 2015, the NHDSC weighed in on the matter of whether or not a hot dog qualified as a type of sandwich by releasing a policy to end the debate, stating that a hot dog is not a sandwich.   Other sources dispute this claim.

See also
 Hot Dog days

References

External links
 

Advocacy groups in the United States
Hot dogs
Sausages
Meat processing in the United States
Trade associations based in the United States
Food industry trade groups